Milan Begović (January 19, 1876 – May 13, 1948) was a Croatian writer, born in Vrlika, in the territory of today's Croatia.

He was educated in Split, Zagreb and Vienna and spent some time as high school professor in Split before going to Hamburg and Vienna to pursue career in theatre. Begović wrote stories and novels, but he is best known for plays he wrote in 1920 and 1930. The best known titles are Pustolov pred vratima (Adventurer at the Door) and comedy Amerikanska jahta u splitskoj luci (American Yacht in Split Harbour). He also wrote the lyrics for a famous Croatian opera Ero s onoga svijeta. In 1942, he edited Hrvatska proza XX. stoljeća, a collection of contemporary Croatian writers. 

With the establishment of communist Yugoslavia in 1945, the Writers' Society of Croatia judged that Begović had collaborated with the war-time Independent State of Croatia. Begović died in Zagreb in 1948 and, due to his falling out with the regime, his death was neither announced nor given special honours. He was buried at Mirogoj Cemetery.

References

External links

 Ljetopis Milana Begovića 

1876 births
1948 deaths
People from Vrlika
Croatian dramatists and playwrights
Croatian writers
Members of the Croatian Academy of Sciences and Arts
Burials at Mirogoj Cemetery
Yugoslav writers